Gloucestershire Constabulary is the territorial police force responsible for policing the non-metropolitan county of Gloucestershire in England.

The force formerly covered the area of South Gloucestershire, however this was transformed to the newly formed Avon and Somerset Constabulary in 1974.

, the force consisted of 1,176 police officers, 100 police community support officers, 113 special constables and 358 police support volunteers.

History
The force was founded in 1839, six hours after Wiltshire Constabulary, making it the second rural police force formed in Britain. The force in its present form dates from 1 April 1974, when the southern part of Gloucestershire became part of the County of Avon and thus covered by the newly formed Avon and Somerset Constabulary.

In 1965, the force had an establishment of 1,010 and an actual strength of 867.

Between 2010 and 2019, the force lost 238 officers due to Government budget cuts.

From 2013 to 2019, specialist teams – roads, firearms and police dogs – operated in a "tri-force" collaboration with the Avon and Somerset, and Wiltshire forces. In April 2019, this arrangement was ended by the Gloucestershire Police and Crime Commissioner, Martin Surl, following Avon and Somerset Police withdrawing from the alliance.

In 2019, Her Majesty's Inspectorate of Constabulary and Fire & Rescue Services rated the force as 'inadequate' for crime reporting arrangements, after finding that over 7,900 incidents of crime in the county per year, and only 69.2% of violent crimes were recorded accurately. The inspection also found 38% of victims were not informed when crime reports were cancelled.

In 2020, the force opened a new  police academy, the Sabrina Centre, on the grounds of the former Berkeley Nuclear Power Station. This coincided with the force offering new Police Constable Degree Apprenticeships in partnership with the University of South Wales.

Chief constables
 1839–1865: Anthony Thomas Lefroy (first Chief Constable of Glos)
 1865–1910: Admiral Henry Christian 
 1910–1917: Lieutenant Colonel Richard Chester-Master (killed in action 1917)
 1918–1937: Major F.L. Stanley Clarke
 1937–1959: Colonel William Francis Henn
 1959–1962: John Gaskain
 1963–1975: Edwin White
 1975–1979: Brian Weigh
 1979–1987: Leonard Soper
 1987–1993: Albert Pacey
 1993–2001: Anthony J.P. Butler
 2001–2010: Timothy Brain
 2010–2012: Tony Melville
 2012–2013: Michael Matthews
 2013–2017: Suzette Davenport
 2017–present: Rod Hansen

Officers killed in the line of duty

The Police Roll of Honour Trust and Police Memorial Trust list and commemorate all British police officers killed in the line of duty. Since its establishment in 1984, the Police Memorial Trust has erected 50 memorials nationally to some of those officers.

Since 1817 the following officers of Gloucestershire Constabulary were killed while attempting to prevent or stop a crime in progress:
 Parish constable Henry Thompson, 1817 (shot by men attempting to free a prisoner)
 Police sergeant Samuel Beard, 1861 (died from injuries sustained attempting to arrest poachers)
 Police sergeant William Morris, 1895 (fatally injured by men he warned about their conduct)

Structure
Day-to-day policing in the county is split into 55 local communities, organised by three Local Policing Areas each overseen by a superintendent: Cheltenham and Tewkesbury, Gloucester and the Forest of Dean, and Cotswolds and Stroud. Each of these areas contains a Local Policing Team, providing an initial response to incidents, as well as a Neighbourhood Policing Team, which manage local concerns.

Special Constabulary 
, the force had 113 special constables, who are mainly embedded in the Local Policing Teams and Neighbourhood Policing teams. A number of officers have been upskilled in rural crime and the use of 4x4 off-road vehicles to enhance the forces capability in this area.

PEEL inspection
Her Majesty's Inspectorate of Constabulary and Fire & Rescue Services (HMICFRS) conducts a periodic police effectiveness, efficiency and legitimacy (PEEL) inspection of each police service's performance. In its latest PEEL inspection, Gloucestershire Constabulary was rated as follows:

Investigations
In 2015, Gloucestershire police were able to show using biomechanical evidence that Robert Nowak was the driver of a car involved in a crash in 2013 in which his friend Michal Sobolak was killed. Nowak was sentenced to ten years imprisonment and seven years disqualification from driving, for Death by Dangerous Driving, Conspiring to Pervert the Course of Justice and Driving whilst Disqualified.

Race and sex discrimination in recruitment
In November 2006, a tribunal ruled that the constabulary had illegally discriminated against 108 white male candidates it had rejected from its recruitment process solely because of their race and gender. Matt Powell, one of the "randomly deselected" candidates, took legal action and was awarded £2,500 compensation. The Commission for Racial Equality (CRE) and the Equal Opportunities Commission who led the investigation stated that the Gloucestershire Police had unlawfully discriminated on the grounds of race and gender. The same illegal policy was also used by Avon and Somerset Constabulary.

See also
 Law enforcement in the United Kingdom
 List of law enforcement agencies in the United Kingdom, Crown Dependencies and British Overseas Territories

References

External links

 
 Gloucestershire Constabulary at HMICFRS

Constabulary
Police forces of England
Government agencies established in 1839
1839 establishments in England